The Chamangá River is a river in Uruguay.

Location

It is situated in northern Flores Department.

Fluvial system

The river is a tributary of the arroyo Maciel, itself flowing into the Yí River. The Yí River is a tributary of the westward draining Río Negro. The Chamangá River rises in a range of hills known as the Cuchilla Grande, and it generally runs from south to north in the Flores Department.

Disambiguation

The settlement of Chamangá is situated nearby.

References

 
 :es:Flores (departamento)#Hidrografía

See also
 Localidad Rupestre de Chamangá
 Chamangá#Disambiguation
 Yi River#Fluvial system
 Geography of Uruguay#Topography and hydrography

Rivers of Uruguay
Tributaries of the Uruguay River
Rivers of Flores Department